Gregory Terrace is a road in Brisbane, Queensland, Australia.

Geography
Gregory Terrace commences at an intersection with Wickham Terrace and College Road in Spring Hill . It travels in a north-easterly direction through Spring Hill, Fortitude Valley and Herston, where it terminates at a junction with Brookes Street.

Landmarks
There are many landmarks along Gregory Terrace, including (from Spring Hill to Herston, sorted by street number/position):
 Roma Street Parkland
 17: Cliveden Mansions
 24: Brisbane Grammar School and its buildings
 Brisbane Girls Grammar School
 285: St Joseph's College, Gregory Terrace
 369: Victoria Flats
 400: Centenary Pool Complex
 449 & 451: Grangehill
 454: Victoria Park
 480: Old Museum Building
 574: Brisbane Exhibition Ground

References

External links

Roads in Brisbane